Upsilon Octantis (Upsilon Oct), Latinized from υ Octantis, is a solitary star in the southern circumpolar constellation Octans. It is faintly visible to the naked eye with an apparent magnitude of 5.75 and is located 343 light years away from the Solar System.

Upsilon Oct has a stellar classification of K0 III, indicating that it is a red giant. At present it has 2.12 times the mass of the Sun but has expanded to 10.3 times its girth. Upsilon Oct has a solar metallicity, with an iron abundance equivalent to the Sun's.

References

K-type giants
Octans
High-proper-motion stars
Octantis, Upsilon
Octantis, 71
PD-86 00406
211539
111196
8505